Gergő Kiss (born 12 May 1977) is a Hungarian swimmer. He competed in the men's 400 metre individual medley event at the 1996 Summer Olympics.

References

1977 births
Living people
Hungarian male swimmers
Olympic swimmers of Hungary
Swimmers at the 1996 Summer Olympics
Swimmers from Budapest
20th-century Hungarian people
21st-century Hungarian people